Ask Max is a 1986 American television film starring Jeff Cohen as Max Baxter, a kid inventor. Max designs a bike that he sells to a toy company.

Cast
Kareem Abdul-Jabbar as Himself
Kreag Caffey as The Coach
Byron Clark as Marcus
Christie Clark as Shelly Meyers
Jeff Cohen as Max Baxter
April Dawn as Student #1
Gino De Mauro as Dennis
Andy Dunbar as Basketball Player
Deena Freeman as Pam
Scott Freeman as Bike Rider
Corki Grazer as Rider #1
Ryan Lambert as Bully #1
Bret Granville as Bully #2
Walter Raymond as History Teacher
Kat Sawyer-Young as Miss Phillips
Patrick Stehr as Student #2
Mark L. Taylor as Braff
Glynn Turman as Lloyd Lyman
Tami Turner as Adrian
Ray Walston as John Harmon
Cassie Yates as Jennifer Baxter

External links 
 

Disney television films
1986 television films
1986 films
1986 comedy films
Films directed by Vincent McEveety
American comedy television films
1980s American films
1980s English-language films